The Proto-Italic language is the ancestor of the Italic languages, most notably Latin and its descendants, the Romance languages. It is not directly attested in writing, but has been reconstructed to some degree through the comparative method. Proto-Italic descended from the earlier Proto-Indo-European language.

History

Although an equation between archeological and linguistic evidence cannot be established with certainty, the Proto-Italic language is generally associated with the Terramare (1700–1150 BC) and Villanovan cultures (900–700 BC).

On the other hand, work in glottochronology has argued that Proto-Italic split off from the western Proto-Indo-European dialects some time before 2500 BC. It was originally spoken by Italic tribes north of the Alps before they moved south into the Italian Peninsula during the second half of the 2nd millennium BC. Linguistic evidence also points to early contacts with Celtic tribes and Proto-Germanic speakers.

Phonology

Consonants

  was an allophone of  before a velar consonant.
Both of these sounds are relatively uncommon cross-linguistically, and eventually they were eliminated in all later languages, but differently in each.

Vowels

  was perhaps not a true phoneme, but was inserted before consonants as a prop vowel. Thus, it appears necessary to reconstruct  as a distinct sound.

Proto-Italic had the following diphthongs:

Osthoff's law remained productive in Proto-Italic. This caused long vowels to shorten when they were followed by a sonorant and another consonant in the same syllable: VːRC > VRC. As the long diphthongs were also VːR sequences, they could only occur word-finally, and were shortened elsewhere. Long vowels were also shortened before word-final  . This is the cause of the many occurrences of short   in, for example, the endings of the ā-stems or of ā-verbs.

Prosody
Proto-Italic words may have had a fixed stress on the first syllable, a stress pattern which probably existed in most descendants in at least some periods. In Latin, initial stress is posited for the Old Latin period, after which it gave way to the "Classical" stress pattern. However, fixed initial stress may alternatively be an areal feature postdating Proto-Italic, since the vowel reductions which it is posited
to explain are not found before the mid-first millennium BC.

Furthermore, the persistence of Proto-Indo-European mobile accent is required in early Proto-Italic for Brent Vine's (2006) reformulation of Thurneysen-Havet's law (where pre-tonic *ou > *au) to work (M. de Vaan, Etymological Dictionary of Latin, 2008, Brill, p. 9; B. Vine, 2006: “On ‘Thurneysen-Havet’s Law’ in Latin and Italic”; Historische
Sprachforschung 119, 211-249.).

Grammar

Nouns
Nouns could have one of three genders: masculine, feminine and neuter. They declined for seven of the eight Proto-Indo-European cases: nominative, vocative, accusative, genitive, dative, ablative and locative. The instrumental case had been lost. Nouns also declined for number in singular and plural. The dual number was no longer distinguished, although a few remnants (like Latin) still preserved some form of the inherited dual inflection.

o-stems
This class corresponds to the second declension of Latin. It descends from the Proto-Indo-European thematic declension. Most nouns in this class were masculine or neuter, but there may have been some feminine nouns as well.

The distribution in Proto-Italic is unclear, but both endings certainly still existed.
 In Old Latin, the genitive plural was still generally  , later  . It was then reformed based on the ā-stem form  , giving the classical  .

ā-stems
This class corresponds to the first declension of Latin.

 The accusative singular ending would have been *-am originally, due to shortening of long vowels before final *-m. However, a long vowel is found in the attested forms. This long vowel most likely arose by analogy with the other endings that have a long vowel.
 The genitive plural ending was originally a pronominal form, PIE *-eh₂-soHom.

Consonant stems
This class contained nouns with stems ending in a variety of consonants. They included root nouns, n-stems, r-stems, s-stems and t-stems among others. It corresponds to the third declension of Latin, which also includes the i-stems, originally a distinct class.

Masculine and feminine nouns declined alike, while neuters had different forms in the nominative/accusative/vocative.

Nouns in this class often had a somewhat irregular nominative singular form. This created several subtypes, based on the final consonant of the stem.

 For most consonant stem nouns, the ending of the nominative/vocative singular was -s for masculine and feminine nouns. Neuter nouns had no ending.
 n-stems generally had the ending *-ō, with the infix *-on- (or maybe *-en-) in the other cases. Neuters had *-ən in the nom/voc/acc singular, while the stem of the remaining forms is unclear.
 r-stems had *-ēr, alternating with *-(e)r-. The alternation in vowel length was lost in Latin, but is preserved in Oscan.
 s-stems had *-ōs (for masculines and feminines) or *-os (for neuters). This alternated with *-ez- (or maybe *-oz- in some masculine/feminine nouns) in the other forms.
 The r/n-stems were a small group of neuter nouns. These had *-or in the nominative/vocative/accusative singular, but *-(e)n- in the remaining forms.

Other notes:
 The genitive singular had two possible endings. Both are attested side by side in Old Latin, although the ending -es/-is may also be from the i-stems (see below). In Osco-Umbrian, only the i-stem ending -eis is found.
 The Latin masculine nominative plural ending -ēs (with a long vowel) was taken from the i-stems.
 The neuter nominative/vocative/accusative plural originally had short *-a as the ending, or lengthening of the vowel before the final consonant. Already in Italic, this was replaced with the o-stem ending *-ā.
 The dative (and ablative/locative?) plural ending would have originally been added directly to the stem, with no intervening vowel. In Latin, there is an intervening -e- or -i-, while in Osco-Umbrian the ending is replaced altogether. It's not clear what the Proto-Italic situation was.

i-stems
This class corresponds to the nouns of the Latin 'third declension that had the genitive plural ending -ium (rather than -um). In Latin, the consonant stems gradually merged with this class. This process continued into the historical era; e.g. in Caesar's time (c. 50 BC) the i-stems still had a distinct accusative plural ending -īs, but this was replaced with the consonant-stem ending -ēs by the time of Augustus (c. AD 1). In Proto-Italic, as in the other Italic languages, i-stems were still very much a distinct type and showed no clear signs of merging.

Masculine and feminine nouns declined alike, while neuters had different forms in the nominative/accusative/vocative.

 There were apparently two different forms for the genitive singular. The form -eis is found in Osco-Umbrian. However, -es appears in early Latin, while there is no sign of *-eis. This could reflect the consonant-stem ending, but it could also come from *-jes. Compare also *-wos of the u-stems, which is attested in Old Latin, and may represent a parallel formation.
 The original form of the neuter nominative/vocative/accusative plural was *-ī. Already in Italic, this was extended by adding the o-stem ending to it.

u-stems
This class corresponds to the fourth declension of Latin. They were historically parallel to the i-stems, and still showed many similar forms, with j/i being replaced with w/u. However, sound changes had made them somewhat different over time.

 The neuter nominative/vocative/accusative singular must have originally been short *-u, but in Latin only long -ū is found. It is unclear what the origin of this could be. It may be a remnant of a dual ending, considering that neuter u-stems were rare, and the few that survived tended to occur in pairs.
 Like the i-stems, the u-stems had two possible types of genitive singular ending, with an unclear distribution. *-ous is found in Oscan, and it is also the origin of the usual Latin ending -ūs. However, the Senatus consultum de Bacchanalibus inscription attests senatvos, and the ending -uis (from *-wes) is also found in a few sources.
 The masculine/feminine nominative/vocative plural is not securely reconstructable. Latin -ūs seems to reflect *-ous, but from PIE *-ewes the form *-owes (Latin *-uis) would be expected. The ending is not attested in Osco-Umbrian or Old Latin, which might have otherwise given conclusive evidence.
 The original form of the neuter nominative/vocative/accusative plural was *-ū. Already in Italic, this was extended by adding the o-stem ending to it, like in the i-stems.

Adjectives
Adjectives inflected much the same as nouns. Unlike nouns, adjectives did not have inherent genders. Instead, they inflected for all three genders, taking on the same gender-form as the noun they referred to.

Adjectives followed the same inflectional classes of nouns. The largest were the o/ā-stem adjectives (which inflected as o-stems in the masculine and neuter, and as ā-stems in the feminine), and the i-stems. Present active participles of verbs (in *-nts) and the comparative forms of adjectives (in *-jōs) inflected as consonant stems. There were also u-stem adjectives originally, but they had been converted to i-stems by adding i-stem endings onto the existing u-stem, thus giving the nominative singular *-wis.

Pronouns
Declension of Personal Pronouns:

Note: For the third person pronoun, Proto-Italic  would have been used.

Declension of Relative Pronouns:

Declension of Interrogative Pronouns:

Declension of Demonstrative Pronouns:

 "this, that"

Verbs

Present Aspect

From Proto-Indo-European, the Proto-Italic present aspect changed in a couple of ways. This likely occurred due to the elision of word-final  within the Indo-European primary verb endings (E.g. PIE Present Indicative  > PIt , but also PIE Past Indicative ). Secondly, the desiderative suffix of  became the future suffix in Proto-Italic. The subjunctive of this desiderative-future, with a suffix of both -s- and a lengthening of the following vowel, was used to represent a potentialis and irrealis mood. Finally, while the subjunctive and the optative of PIE were still in principle different moods, the moods became merged in Post-PIt developments (E.g. PIt subjunctive  vs optative  which became Latin present subjunctive ); this can be already seen in the Proto-Italic phase, where the subjunctive mood began to take secondary endings as opposed to the primary endings they exhibited in PIE (c.f. the Sabellian reflex of the PIt 3rd person singular imperfect subjunctive being -d and not *-t).

The PIE dual person was also lost within PIt verbs just as it was in PIt nouns.

First Conjugation

This Conjugation pattern was derived from the PIE suffix , and formed primarily denominative verbs (I.e. deriving from a noun or an adjective).

Example Conjugation: *dōnā- (to give)

Second Conjugation Causative

This conjugation pattern was derived from PIE  *-éyeti, and formed causative verbs (I.e. expressing a cause) from "basic" 3rd conjugation verbs.

Example Conjugation: *mone- (to warn)

Second Conjugation Stative

This conjugation pattern was derived from PIE *-éh₁ti (or the extended form *-eh₁yéti), and formed stative verbs (I.e. indicating a state of being).

Example Conjugation: *walē- (to be strong)

Third Conjugation

The bulk of Proto-Italic verbs were third-conjugation verbs, which were derived from Proto-Indo-European root thematic verbs. However, some are derived from other PIE verb classes, such as *linkʷō (PIE nasal-infix verbs) and *dikskō (PIE *sḱe-suffix verbs).

Example Conjugation: *ed-e/o- (to eat)

Third Conjugation jō-variant

This conjugation was derived from PIE *ye-suffix verbs, and went on to form most of Latin 3rd conjugation io-variant verbs as well as some 4th conjugation verbs.

Example Conjugation: *gʷen-je/jo- (to come)

Athematic Verbs

Only a handful of verbs remained within this conjugation paradigm, derived from the original PIE Root Athematic verbs.

Example Conjugation: *ezom (copula, to be)

In addition to these conjugations, Proto-Italic also has some deponent verbs, such as *ōdai (Perfect-Present), as well as *gnāskōr (Passive-Active).

Perfective Aspect

According to Rix(2002), if a verb stem is present in both the Latino-Faliscan and Osco-Umbrian (Sabellian) branches, the present stem is identical in 90% of cases, but the perfect in only 50% of cases. This is likely because the original PIE aorist merged with the perfective aspect after the Proto-Italic period. Thus, the discrepancy in the similarities of present versus perfect stems in the two groupings of the Italic clade is likely attributed to different preservations in each group. The new common perfect stem in Latino-Faliscan derives mostly from the PIE Perfective, while the perfect stem in Osco-Umbrian derives mostly from the PIE aorist.

In the Proto-Italic period, the root perfect of PIE was no longer productive. However, other PIE perfect and aorist stems continued to be productive, such as the reduplicated perfect and lengthened-vowel perfect stems, as well as the sigmatic aorist stem (found in Latin dīcō, dīxī).

Sometimes, multiple perfect forms for each stem. For example, De Vaan gives the forms *fēk-, *fak- for the perfect stem of *fakiō, and the reduplicated form <FHEFHAKED> is also attested on the Praeneste fibula in Old Latin.

In addition, there were some new innovations within the perfective aspect, with the -v- perfect (in Latin amō, amāvī) and the -u- perfect (moneō, monuī) being later innovations, for example.

Example Long-Vowel Conjugation: *fēk- (to have done). Alternatively *θēk- (from PIE *dʰeh₁-) if PIt is reconstructed at a stage before /xʷ/ and /θ/ had merged with /f/ [ɸ].

Example Reduplicated Conjugation: *fefu- (to have been)

Development
A list of regular phonetic changes from Proto-Indo-European to Proto-Italic follows. Because Latin is the only well-attested Italic language, it forms the main source for the reconstruction of Proto-Italic. It is therefore not always clear whether certain changes apply to all of Italic (a pre-PI change), or only to Latin (a post-PI change), because of lack of conclusive evidence.

Obstruents
 Palatovelars merged with plain velars, a change termed centumization.
 *ḱ > *k
 *ǵ > *g
 *ǵʰ > *gʰ
 Sequences of palatovelars and *w merged with labiovelars: *ḱw, *ǵw, *ǵʰw > *kʷ, *gʷ, *gʷʰ
 *p...kʷ > *kʷ...kʷ, a change also found in Celtic.
 Labiovelars lose their labialisation before a consonant: *kʷC, *gʷC, *gʷʰC > *kC, *gC, *gʰC.
 Obstruent consonants become (unaspirated) voiceless before another voiceless consonant (usually *s or *t).
 Voiced aspirates become fricatives. Word-initially, they become voiceless, while they are allophonically voiced word-medially. Judging from Oscan evidence, they apparently remained fricatives even after a nasal consonant. In most other Italic languages they developed into stops later in that position.
 *bʰ > *f (medially *β)
 *dʰ > *θ (medially *ð)
 *gʰ > *x (medially *ɣ)
 *gʷʰ > *xʷ (medially *ɣʷ)
 *s was also allophonically voiced to *z word-medially.
 *sr, *zr > *θr, *ðr.
 *θ, *xʷ > *f. Found in Venetic vhagsto/hvagsto (compare Latin faciō). The voiced allophones *ð and *ɣʷ remained distinct from *β in Latin and Venetic, but also merged in Osco-Umbrian.
 *tl > *kl word-medially.

Vowels and sonorants
 *l̥, *r̥ > *ol, *or
 *m̥, *n̥ > *əm, *ən (see above on "Vowels")
 *j is lost between vowels. The resulting vowels in hiatus contract into a long vowel if the two vowels are the same.
 *ew > *ow.
 *o > *a before labials and *l.

Laryngeals
The laryngeals are a class of hypothetical PIE sounds *h₁, *h₂, *h₃ that usually disappeared in late PIE, leaving coloring effects on adjacent vowels. Their disappearance left some distinctive sound combinations in Proto-Italic. In the changes below, the # follows standard practice in denoting a word boundary; that is, # at the beginning denotes word-initial. H denotes any of the three laryngeals.

The simpler Italic developments of laryngeals are shared by many other Indo-European branches:
 *h₁e > *e, *h₂e > *a, *h₃e > *o
 *eh₁ > *ē, *eh₂ > *ā, *eh₃ > *ō
 *H > *a between obstruents
 Laryngeals are lost word-initially before a consonant.

More characteristic of Italic are the interactions of laryngeals with sonorant consonants. Here, R represents a sonorant, and C a consonant.
 #HRC > #aRC and CHRC > CaRC, but #HRV > #RV
 CRHC > CRāC, but CRHV > CaRV
 CiHC and probably CHiC > CīC

Morphology
 General loss of the dual, with only a few relics remaining.
 Loss of the instrumental case.

Textual sample

Poem

Lord's Prayer

Post-Italic developments
Further changes occurred during the evolution of individual Italic languages. This section gives an overview of the most notable changes. For complete lists, see History of Latin and other articles relating to the individual languages.

This change possibly took place within the Proto-Italic period. Initial *xl, *xr are reflected (in Latin at least) as gl, gr
 *θ(e)r, *ð(e)r > *f(e)r, *β(e)r in all but Venetic. Compare Venetic louder-obos to Latin līber, Faliscan loifir-ta, Oscan lúvfreis.
 *β, *ð, *ɣ > Latin b, d, g. In Osco-Umbrian the result is f (probably voiced) for all three. In Faliscan, *β remains a fricative.
 *ɣʷ > *gʷ in Latin, which then develops as below. > f in Osco-Umbrian.
 *dw > b in classical Latin, although still retained in the archaic (see Duenos inscription)
 *kʷ, *gʷ > p, b in Osco-Umbrian. They are retained in Latino-Faliscan and Venetic. In Latin, *gʷ > v  except after *n.
 *z > r in Classical Latin and Umbrian, but not in Old Latin or Oscan.
 Final -ā (fem. sg. nom., neut. pl. nom./acc.) >  in Osco-Umbrian, but becomes short -a in Latin.
 Final *-ns (acc. pl. of various noun classes), *-nts (masc. nom. sg. of participles), and *-nt (neut. nom./acc. sg. of participles) developed in complex ways:

 Latin vowel reduction, during the Old Latin period. This merged many of the unstressed short vowels; most dramatically, all short vowels merged (usually to /i/) in open medial syllables. Furthermore, all diphthongs became pure vowels except for *ai and *au (and occasionally *oi) in initial syllables.

References

Bibliography

Italic languages
Italic